Bertrams is a suburb of Johannesburg, South Africa. It is a small suburb found on the eastern edge of the Johannesburg central business district (CBD), tucked between the suburbs of New Doornfontein and Lorentzville, with Troyeville to the south. It is located in Region F of the City of Johannesburg Metropolitan Municipality.

History
The suburb was founded on one of the original farms on the Witwatersrand, after a strip of land was sold from the farm Doornfontein. The suburb was named after its real estate developer Robertson Fuller Bertrams. It was proclaimed a suburb on 16 August 1889 and was initially called Bertramstown. By the 1930s, Bertrams accommodated a 'racially mixed working class population'. However, in the 1930s, black residents of Bertrams were some of the black people to be relocated to Orlando. Indian and coloured people were also relocated in order establish a white working class housing scheme. Bertrams began to desegregate two decades before the 1991 repeal of apartheid's racial segregation policies.

Present suburb
Bertrams is a clean and friendly neighbourhood, close to Ellis Park Stadium. With amenities including the swimming pool and the University of Johannesburg within this locality. Bertrams borders central Johannesburg or "Town" but is suburban enough to maintain its calm and pleasant atmosphere while being close to it and easy to access. Unemployment is high in this council owned area but there is a relaxed and friendly atmosphere. Everything you need is in Bertrams and if you cannot find what you want there just pop into town and try your luck there.

References

Johannesburg Region F